Ramon Montaño (born March 3, 1937) is Filipino politician and retired military officer during the administration of President Corazon Aquino. He ran as an independent candidate for the 2013 Philippine Senate elections, but he lost.

Montaño plans to create laws that would serve as guidelines to improve the police and military service. He also advocates a review of the Local Government Code as well as the removal of the power of local politicians over the Philippine National Police. He also plans to work for the rights of retired soldiers and police officers.

Notes

References

1937 births
Living people
Filipino police chiefs
Independent politicians in the Philippines
People from Cebu City
People from Negros Oriental
Liberal Party (Philippines) politicians
National Security Advisers of the Philippines
Philippine Military Academy alumni
Corazon Aquino administration personnel
Recipients of the Presidential Medal of Merit (Philippines)